This is a list of the National Register of Historic Places listings in Joshua Tree National Park.

This is intended to be a complete list of the properties and districts on the National Register of Historic Places in Joshua Tree National Park, California, United States.  The locations of National Register properties and districts for which the latitude and longitude coordinates are included below, may be seen in an online map.

There are six properties and districts listed on the National Register in the park.

Current listings 

|}

See also 
 National Register of Historic Places listings in Riverside County, California
 National Register of Historic Places listings in San Bernardino County, California
 National Register of Historic Places listings in San Diego County, California
 List of National Historic Landmarks in California
 National Register of Historic Places listings in California

References

External links

Joshua Tree National Park